The 100-Mosques-Plan is the project of the Ahmadiyya Muslim Jamaat in Germany to built 100 new mosques. It was initiated by Mirza Tahir Ahmad, the Khalifatul Masih IV, during the centenary celebrations of the community in 1989. The project is completely financed by the Ahmadiyya Muslim Community, Germany, through collections from the members. The plans and the execution of the projects is also mostly performed by German Ahmadis voluntarily. Ahmadiyya Muslim Community has total of 52 mosques and 65 prayer centres in Germany.

Mosques

Notes

References